Xanthosoma hylaeae is a species of flowering plant in the family Araceae, native to western South America and northern Brazil. A night-bloomer, it uses a variety of scents to attract its pollinators, scarab beetles in the tribe Cyclocephalini.

References

hylaeae
Flora of western South America
Flora of North Brazil
Plants described in 1914